Edmund John "Ted" Martin (30 September 1902 – 9 June 2004) was an Australian cricketer who played two first-class matches in 1932–33, both against a touring English side under the captaincy of Douglas Jardine, which used Bodyline tactics. In his first match, for Western Australia against the tourists, he took three wickets in each innings bowling leg breaks, including the wickets of Herbert Sutcliffe, Maurice Leyland, Hedley Verity and the Nawab of Pataudi. In his second match, for an Australian XI against the tourists, he failed to take a wicket, recording figures of 0/126 in his only innings, and making a single run before being stumped by George Duckworth off the bowling of Tommy Mitchell.

Martin died in Perth, Western Australia, at the age of 101 years and 253 days, making him the fifth oldest first-class cricketer ever, and the oldest ever Australian cricketer, as well as the ninth first-class cricketer, and the first Australian cricketer, to live to be 100 years old. Between the death of Jim Hutchinson in November 2000 and his own death he was the oldest living first-class cricketer.

See also
 List of Western Australia first-class cricketers

References

External links

1902 births
2004 deaths
Australian centenarians
Australian cricketers
Cricketers from Victoria (Australia)
Men centenarians
Sportspeople from Bendigo
Western Australia cricketers